Salwa Eid Naser (née Ebelechukwu Agbapuonwu, born 23 May 1998) is a Nigerian-born Bahraini sprinter who specialises in the 400 metres. She was the 2019 World champion with the third fastest time in history of 48.14 seconds, becoming the youngest-ever champion in the event and also the first woman representing an Asian nation to win that event at a World Championships. The mark places her only behind contested results of Marita Koch (47.60; 1985) and Jarmila Kratochvílová (47.99; 1983). Over the distance, at only 19, Naser was the 2017 World silver medalist. She has also won, as a member of Bahraini mixed-gender 4x400 m relay team, the 2019 World Championships bronze medal.

Eid Naser was in her signature event the 2014 Youth Olympic silver medallist and 2015 World Youth champion, before taking her first senior medal which was gold at the 2015 Military World Games. The then 18-year-old skipped the 2016 World U20 Championships, in which a winning time was 51.32 s, to compete directly with the world's best 400 m sprinters at the 2016 Rio Olympics, where she placed injured equal ninth in the semi-finals in 50.88 s. She is multiple medallist of Asian Games, Asian Championships, as well as other top-level military and pan-regional competitions, both individually and on relays. A two-time 400 m Diamond League champion, as of December 2022, she held the eight fastest Asian results of all time, nine marks in the top 10, and 18 in the top 20.

On 30 June 2021, it was announced that Salwa Eid Naser had been banned until February 2023 due to three whereabouts failures. She was tested negative for doping 19 times between 12 April and 24 November 2019 (no publicly available data on her out-of competition tests before/after). She was first provisionally suspended in June 2020 and then cleared by AIU Disciplinary Tribunal in October. CAS upheld appeal from WA (and WADA). It was reported that one of three panel members was against the decision.

Early life
Salwa Eid Naser was born Ebelechukwu Antoinette Agbapuonwu on 23 May 1998 in Onitsha, Anambra, to a Nigerian mother and (as it was reported) Bahraini born father. Her mother had competed as a 100 m and 200 metres sprinter at school and she quickly discovered an ability to sprint. At age 11, in her first competitive race in school she won the 100 m, and then later also the 400 m. Her teacher insisted that she would make a good 400 m runner so she started to focus on the distance. Before Naser was 14, the family moved to Bahrain. In 2014, she switched allegiance to Bahrain, converted to Islam, and changed her name. When asked in 2017 about her move, she said, "past three years have been a great transition for me" and did not wish to comment on her relationship with the Athletics Federation of Nigeria. In 2019, she said she was happy that people in Nigeria were celebrating her win.

Career

2014–2016: World youth champion

Based in Riffa in Bahrain's Southern Governorate, Naser had her first success at the 2014 Arab Junior Championships, where she was a gold medalist in both the 200 m and 400 m. Following this achievement, she began to take the sport more seriously and set a new personal best of 54.50 seconds at the Asian Trials for the 2014 Youth Olympics. Naser steadily improved her best further at the Olympics, recording 53.95 s in the first round, before taking a silver medal behind Australia's Jessica Thornton with a much improved time of 52.74 s. The sprinter then began working with former Bulgarian athlete Yanko Bratanov, who also coached fellow Nigerian-Bahraini athletes Kemi Adekoya and Samuel Francis (banned / disqualified for doping) among others.

In May 2015, she confirmed herself as the continent's best 400 m runner in her age group with a gold medal at the Asian Youth Championships. In June while in Bulgaria, she set national junior records in the 100 m and 200 m, clocking 11.70 s and 23.03 s respectively. Eid Naser then proved herself among the best globally in the 400 m at the World Youth Championships. A patient run in a tight hijab, what was her own decision, saw her overhaul the more favoured American Lynna Irby in the final stages of the race, and she achieved a lifetime best of 51.50 s to take the gold medal. The final came on the day after Ramadan which allowed her to eat normally before the race, after having fasted during the qualifying rounds. The gold medal made her the second ever Bahraini woman to win a global-level title, after senior world champion Maryam Yusuf Jamal. Her tactical running was praised by USA's decathlon world record holder Ashton Eaton, who invited her on an all expenses paid trip to train with him for three days.

Barely 17 years old, in October 2015, she took her first senior title at the Military World Games. Competing in the 400 m against 2012 Olympians Bianca Răzor and Nataliya Pyhyda, she improved to win a gold medal with a world youth-leading and national under-20 record time of 51.39 s, becoming the youngest ever winner of that title. This result was the second-fastest Asian under-18—and 10th fastest world U18—time in history.

Naser had since been coached by Nigerian ex-pat John George Obeya, who had been based in Bahrain for several years.

At the 2016 Summer Olympics in Rio de Janeiro, the 18-year-old made her next progress and won her heat with a personal best of 51.06 s. In the semi-final, she improved even further running 50.88 s, but placed equal ninth overall and did not advance by one place and 0.13 s; her time ranks her however sixth in the final results. Just a week earlier, Naser twisted her ankle, which was first weakened when she was struck by a car aged six. It opened up a fracture and she was advised not to compete, but wanted to, in her first Olympics. After the Games, she had to take three months rest to treat her leg.

2017–2019: World silver medalist and champion

While still a junior, Salwa Eid Naser claimed the silver medal at the 2017 World Championships 400 m event with a new personal best of 50.06 seconds, after winning and each time improving in her heat and semi-final, finally lowering her personal best by a massive 0.82 s. The final took place on a wet surface during light rain. She was last midway through the race and when she turned for home she was still only fourth, eventually beating Allyson Felix by 0.02 and being beaten only by Phyllis Francis (photo finish). Shaunae Miller-Uibo had been leading until last 30 meters when she got the staggers and dropped from first to fourth. At age 19, it made Naser the youngest woman ever to reach the podium over 400 m at a World Championships; she also thrice broke a Bahraini national record. Less than two weeks later, she won in the distance at the Diamond League meeting in Birmingham, and then set even better personal best of 49.88 s in Brussels a week later, securing second place overall in the Diamond Race. This result, the third-fastest world under-20 time in history and an Asian U20 record, would have given her first place at the World Championships.

Since November 2017, she has been coached by Dominican Jose Ludwig Rubio.

In 2018, Naser competed at seven 400 m Diamond League events, winning six of them and achieving also six marks below 50 seconds. On 30 June, at the Paris Meeting, she won with a new lifetime best of 49.55 s, breaking an Asian record set in 1993 by Ma Yuqin with 49.81 s. On 20 July, at the Herculis meet in Monaco, she greatly improved her PB in a time of 49.08 s to finish second just behind Shaunae Miller-Uibo, who set the circuit record with her result 48.97. It was the fastest women’s 400 m race run since 2009, and also the first since 1996 in which two women went below 49.10 s. In August, Naser won the race at the Asian Games in Jakarta. On 30 August, she also won the 4 x 100 m relay final and went on to take silver in the 4 x 400 m relay. She flew to Brussels later that night and won the Diamond League 400 m title just hours later in 49.33 s. A few days later, the sprinter won also Continental Cup held in Ostrava running 49.32 s. In 2018 in total, she won 10 out of her 11 400 m races and recorded seven sub-50-second clockings.

During the 2019 Asian Championships in Doha, Qatar she claimed gold medals for both the 200 m and 400 m, and also for the 4 × 400 m relay, 4 × 400 m mixed relay and a bronze for the 4 × 100 m relay. In the 2019 Diamond League events, she competed in and won five 400 m races taking her second circuit championship. The sprinter clocked her best time of 49.17 s setting a meet record, on 5 July at the Athletissima in Lausanne, Switzerland.

On 3 October 2019, Naser became the 400 metres world champion at the Doha World Championships in Qatar, the youngest ever, and also the first Asian female winner of that title. She improved her personal best, set one year earlier, by a massive 0.94 s, and her result of 48.14 seconds had been the fastest since 1985 – that is for 34 years (when Marita Koch set a world record of 47.60), the second-fastest at a World Championships (only behind Jarmila Kratochvílová who ran 47.99 in 1983), and the third-fastest of all time. This had been her fifth race in five days and top five women all set PBs. She additionally took the bronze medal for the 4 × 400 m mixed relay, which set an Asian record. During 2019 Military World Games, the sprinter finished as the gold medallist in her signature event extending her unbeaten streak in the event to 14 straight finals, and a bronze one in the 4 × 100 m relay. Naser finished the 2019 season unbeaten.

2020–present: controversial 2-year suspension
In June 2020, the Athletics Integrity Unit (AIU) announced that Naser has been provisionally suspended for three whereabouts failures over a 12-month period in the lead-up to Doha (1 filing failure, 2 missed tests) after fourth missed out-of-competition test in January 2020, sanctioned with a two-year period of ineligibility. She said, "I only missed three drug tests, which is normal. [...] It can happen to anybody." She was tested negative for doping 19 times between 12 April and 24 November 2019. In October, AIU Disciplinary Tribunal cleared the sprinter dismissing one of those missed tests due to confusion relating to her exact location, and then her filing failure falling outside critical 12-month time frame backdated according to the rules to the start of 2019. Also in January 2020, when travelling overland after her plane was cancelled, she did not reach the Nigerian capital Abuja but only Lagos, Bahraini coach, her third-party in communication who handled her ADAMS database account, failed to update her whereabouts details sleeping. In November, Court of Arbitration for Sport (CAS) informed that World Athletics and WADA filed an appeal.

On 30 June 2021, CAS announced that Salwa Eid Naser had been banned until February 2023, missing the delayed 2020 Tokyo Olympics and the 2022 World Championships.

Recognition
She was recognized as one of the BBC's 100 women of 2019.

Achievements
Information from World Athletics profile unless otherwise noted. Last updated on 15 March 2021.

Personal bests

Season's best

International individual competitions

International relay competitions

Circuit wins and titles
 Diamond League 400 metres champion:  2018,  2019
 2017 (1) (400 m): Birmingham British Grand Prix (50.59)
 2018 (6) (400 m): Rome Golden Gala (50.51), Oslo Bislett Games (49.98), Stockholm Bauhaus-Galan (49.84), Paris Meeting (49.55 ), Lausanne Athletissima (49.78), Brussels Memorial Van Damme (49.33)
 2019 (5) (400 m): Shanghai Diamond League (50.65), Rome Golden Gala (50.26), Rabat Meeting (50.13), Lausanne Athletissima (49.17 ), Zürich Weltklasse (50.24)
 World Challenge meets
 2018 (1) (400 m): Zagreb Hanžeković Memorial (50.54)
 Other meets
 2015 [2]; (1) (100 m): Ruen Cup; (1) (400 m): Ruen Cup
 2016 (1) (400 m): Stara Zagora Meeting (51.63)
 2017 (1) (400 m): Doha Meeting (54.35)
 2019 [4]; (1) (100 m) Salamanca Memorial; (2) (200 m): Salamanca Memorial, Barcelona Meeting; (1) (400 m): Székesfehérvár Memorial (50.13)

See also
 400 metres at the World Athletics Championships
 List of World Championships in Athletics medalists (women)

Notes

References

External links

Videos
 2018 Interview: "I do dream big" – Salwa Eid Naser – via World Athletics on YouTube (includes Continental Cup 400m finish) (2:57)
 2019 Diamond League | Undefeated Salwa Eid Naser cruises to a 400m victory in Zurich – via Diamond League on YouTube (1:13)
 2019 World Athletics Championships | Salwa Eid Naser Storms to 400m Gold | Doha Moments – via World Athletics on YouTube (short version) (1:03)
 2019 World Athletics Championships | Women's 400m Final – via World Athletics on YouTube (12:22)

Living people
1998 births
People from the Southern Governorate, Bahrain
Sportspeople from Anambra State
Converts to Islam
Bahraini female sprinters
Nigerian emigrants to Bahrain
Naturalized citizens of Bahrain
Athletes (track and field) at the 2014 Summer Youth Olympics
Athletes (track and field) at the 2016 Summer Olympics
Athletes (track and field) at the 2018 Asian Games
Olympic athletes of Bahrain
World Athletics Championships athletes for Bahrain
World Athletics Championships medalists
Asian Games medalists in athletics (track and field)
Asian Games gold medalists for Bahrain
Asian Games silver medalists for Bahrain
Medalists at the 2018 Asian Games
World Athletics Championships winners
BBC 100 Women
Diamond League winners
Asian Athletics Championships winners
IAAF Continental Cup winners
Asian Games gold medalists in athletics (track and field)
Olympic female sprinters